Mystery Muses: 100 Classics That Inspire Today's Mystery Writers is a book co-authored and edited by Jim Huang & Austin Lugar, published by Crum Creek Press on 1 August 2006.

The book won the Anthony Award for Best Critical Nonfiction in 2007.

References 

2006 non-fiction books
Anthony Award-winning works
Books about books